Innset is a village in the municipality of Rennebu in Trøndelag county, Norway. Innset Church is located in the village, just north of the Norwegian National Road 3.

The parish of Innset (the village and surrounding rural area) was originally an annex to the main parish and municipality of Kvikne (in Hedmark county), but in 1966 it was transferred to the parish and municipality of Rennebu (in the old Sør-Trøndelag county).

Name
The parish of Innset was established in 1642. It was named after the old Innset farm (Old Norse: Ínnarsetr) since that was where the Innset Church was built. The first element is the genitive case of the name of the river Inna (Old Norse: Ínn) and the last element is setr which means "mountain farm". The meaning of the river name is unknown.  Until 1918 the name was written "Inset".

References

Villages in Trøndelag
Rennebu